The rivière du Bois Clair (in English: light wood river) is a tributary of the east bank of the rivière du Chêne which flows on the south shore of the St. Lawrence River. The Bois Clair river flows in the municipalities of Sainte-Croix-de-Lotbinière and Saint-Édouard-de-Lotbinière, in the Lotbinière Regional County Municipality, in the administrative region of Chaudière-Appalaches, Quebec, Canada.

Geography 

The main neighboring watersheds of the Bois Clair river are:
 north side: Jean-Baptiste stream, Saint-Eustache stream, St. Lawrence River;
 east side: Petit Saut River, Huron River, Bois Franc stream;
 south side: Bras des Boucher, rivière aux Cèdres, rivière aux Ormes, Henri River;
 west side: rivière du Chêne.

The Bois Clair river "has its source at 3e rang south in the municipality of Sainte-Croix. This area also forms the head of the Barbin stream flowing to the north to the St. Lawrence River and a stream flowing east to the Petit Saut River.

  southwesterly in Sainte-Croix, to the western limit of the municipality;
  west, intersecting Route Laliberté and Route Ouellet, to Route Soucy, which it intersects at the village of Saint-Édouard-de-Lotbinière;
  towards the west, crossing the Bélanger road, until its confluence.

The Bois Clair river "flows on the east bank of the rivière du Chêne in Saint-Édouard-de-Lotbinière.

Toponymy 

The term Boisclair is a family name of French origin.

The toponym Rivière du Bois Clair was formalized on December 5, 1968, at the Commission de toponymie du Québec.

See also 

 List of rivers of Quebec

References 

Rivers of Chaudière-Appalaches
Lotbinière Regional County Municipality